Washington County is a county located in the U.S. state of Maine. As of the 2010 census, its population was 31,095, making it the third-least populous county in Maine. Its county seat is Machias. The county was established on June 25, 1789. It borders the Canadian province of New Brunswick.

It is sometimes referred to as "Sunrise County" because it includes the easternmost point in the 48 contiguous United States.  Claims have been made that Washington County is where the sun first rises on the 48 contiguous states.  Many small seaside communities have small-scale fishing-based economies. Tourism is also important along the county's shoreline, but it is not as important as elsewhere in the state. The blueberry crop plays a major role in the county's economy.

Geography

Adjacent counties
 Hancock County – southwest
 Aroostook County – northwest
 Penobscot County – northwest
 York County, New Brunswick, Canada – northeast
 Charlotte County, New Brunswick, Canada – east

National protected areas
 Cross Island National Wildlife Refuge
 Moosehorn National Wildlife Refuge
 Petit Manan National Wildlife Refuge
 Saint Croix Island International Historic Site

Major highways

Demographics

2000 census
As of the census of 2000, there were 33,941 people, 14,118 households, and 9,303 families living in the county.  The population density was 13 people per square mile (5/km2).  There were 21,919 housing units at an average density of 8 per square mile (3/km2).  The racial makeup of the county was 93.48% White, 0.26% Black or African American, 4.43% Native American, 0.30% Asian, 0.01% Pacific Islander, 0.44% from other races, and 1.07% from two or more races.  0.81% of the population were Hispanic or Latino of any race. 95.0% spoke English, 1.9% Passamaquoddy, 1.0% Spanish and 1.0% French as their first language.

There were 14,118 households, out of which 28.00% had children under the age of 18 living with them, 52.10% were married couples living together, 9.50% had a female householder with no husband present, and 34.10% were non-families. 28.30% of all households were made up of individuals, and 13.10% had someone living alone who was 65 years of age or older.  The average household size was 2.34 and the average family size was 2.84.

In the county, the population was spread out, with 22.90% under the age of 18, 8.00% from 18 to 24, 26.30% from 25 to 44, 25.60% from 45 to 64, and 17.30% who were 65 years of age or older.  The median age was 40 years. For every 100 females there were 95.50 males.  For every 100 females age 18 and over, there were 93.90 males.

The median income for a household in the county was $25,869, and the median income for a family was $31,657. Males had a median income of $28,347 versus $20,074 for females. The per capita income for the county was $14,119.  About 14.20% of families and 19.00% of the population were below the poverty line, including 22.40% of those under age 18 and 19.20% of those age 65 or over.

2010 census
As of the 2010 United States Census, there were 32,856 people, 14,302 households, and 8,847 families living in the county. The racial makeup of the county was 92.1% white, 4.9% American Indian, 0.5% Asian, 0.4% black or African American, 0.4% from other races, and 1.7% from two or more races. Those of Hispanic or Latino origin made up 1.4% of the population. In terms of ancestry, 30.4% were English, 17.0% were Irish, 7.0% were German, 6.1% were Scottish, and 5.6% were American.

Of the 14,302 households, 25.9% had children under the age of 18 living with them, 47.1% were married couples living together, 9.6% had a female householder with no husband present, 38.1% were non-families, and 31.6% of all households were made up of individuals. The average household size was 2.24 and the average family size was 2.76. The median age was 46.1 years.

The median income for a household in the county was $34,859 and the median income for a family was $43,612. Males had a median income of $35,981 versus $27,336 for females. The per capita income for the county was $19,401. About 14.1% of families and 19.8% of the population were below the poverty line, including 29.3% of those under age 18 and 12.4% of those age 65 or over.

Government
Washington County is considered to be a more conservative county in Maine. In 2004, it was one of only two counties (the other being Piscataquis County) in Maine to vote for Republican George W. Bush over Democrat John Kerry. The county voted for the winning presidential candidate in every election since 1980 until 2020, when the county was carried by Donald Trump, who lost to Joe Biden.

No Democrat has carried a majority of the county since Hubert Humphrey in 1968. The last Republican to do so was Donald Trump in 2020.

In the 2012 Maine Republican presidential caucuses, the majority of Washington County voters cast their votes for Republican Ron Paul, but votes from Washington County were not counted because of snow. Mitt Romney ultimately won the state by a narrow margin.

Voter registration

|}

Communities

Cities
 Calais
 Eastport

Towns

 Addison
 Alexander
 Baileyville
 Beals
 Beddington
 Charlotte
 Cherryfield
 Columbia
 Columbia Falls
 Cooper
 Crawford
 Cutler
 Danforth
 Deblois
 Dennysville
 East Machias
 Grand Lake Stream
 Harrington
 Jonesboro
 Jonesport
 Lubec
 Machias (county seat)
 Machiasport
 Marshfield
 Meddybemps
 Milbridge
 Northfield
 Pembroke
 Perry
 Princeton
 Robbinston
 Roque Bluffs
 Steuben
 Talmadge
 Topsfield
 Vanceboro
 Waite
 Wesley
 Whiting
 Whitneyville

Plantations
 Baring Plantation
 Codyville Plantation

Unorganized territories
 East Central Washington
 North Washington

Indian reservations
 Passamaquoddy Pleasant Point Reservation
 Passamaquoddy Indian Township Reservation

Census-designated places
 Danforth
 Jonesport
 Lubec
 Machias
 Milbridge
 Vanceboro
 Woodland

Notable people
 Jeremiah O'Brien, (1744-1818) Commander of the sloop Unity during the first naval battle of the Revolutionary War; Machias.
 Henry Plummer (1832–1864), Sheriff and outlaw leader of The Innocents, in Bannock, Montana, Idaho Territory, born and raised in Addison.
 Hiram Burnham (1814-1864), Civil War general; Cherryfield.
 Reuben L. Snowe (1866-1942), Maine state legislator; born in Danforth.
 Theodore Enslin (1925–2011), American poet; resident of Milbridge.
 Carl Willey (1931 - 2009), American professional baseball player; Cherryfield.
 Lyn Mikel Brown (b. 1956), American academic, author, feminist, and community activist; born in Vanceboro.
 Katie Aselton (b. 1978), American actress, film director and producer; born in Milbridge.

See also
 National Register of Historic Places listings in Washington County, Maine

References

External links

 Washington County official website

 
Maine counties
1789 establishments in Massachusetts
Populated places established in 1789